The national coat of arms or national seal of Paraguay ("Escudo de Armas") or ("Sello Nacional") has the following construction:

Description
The coat of arms is on the Paraguay national flag. It lies in the white center section on the flag. 
The obverse of the arms features a round white background with the yellow five-pointed star surrounded by a palm branch to the left and an olive branch to the right both tied together surrounded by the Name of the State: "REPÚBLICA DEL PARAGUAY" (In Spanish for, "REPUBLIC OF PARAGUAY").

The reverse of the arms features a golden lion in front of the staff and the Phrygian cap with the National Motto: "PAZ Y JUSTICIA" (In Spanish for, "PEACE AND JUSTICE").

While probably most prominent on the reverse of the national flag, the reverse of the seal is also used by the Supreme Court of Paraguay, and is featured alongside the obverse on banknotes of the national currency, the guaraní.

The first design of the coat of arms dates to the year 1820, from the time of the dictatorship of Francia.

Historical Coats of arms

See also
Flag of Paraguay
Paraguay

References

External links

Paraguay
National symbols of Paraguay
Paraguay
Paraguay
Paraguay
Paraguay
Paraguay